The 2020 French F4 Championship was the tenth season to run under the guise of the French F4 Championship and the third under the FIA Formula 4 regulations. The championship used Mygale M14-F4 chassis. For 2020, the series used a new 1.3-liter turbocharged engine produced by Renault Sport, replacing the previously used 2.0-litre naturally aspirated engine. The series began on 21 August at Circuit Paul Armagnac and ended on 22 November at Circuit Paul Ricard.

Driver lineup

Race calendar

On 22 April 2020 the series announced a seven-round calendar with a delayed start to the season due to the 2019-20 coronavirus pandemic. The round at Pau that was postponed on 17 March 2020 and not included on the new schedule. The 3rd round scheduled at Hungaroring was replaced by Circuit Zandvoort. The penultimate round of the season at Circuit de Lédenon was cancelled by the circuit and the organizers. The final round at Bugatti Circuit in Le Mans was called off by local authorities. The additional rounds were scheduled to take place at Circuit Paul Ricard.

Championship standings

Points system

Points were awarded as follows:

Each driver's lowest scoring meeting was omitted from their final point total.

Drivers' standings – FFSA Academy

Drivers' standings – FIA Formula 4

Juniors' standings

Notes

References

External links
Official website of the FFSA Academy

F4
French F4
French F4